Under the Wire is the third solo album by dobro player Jerry Douglas, released in 1986 (see 1986 in music). It was his first release on the MCA label. Under the Wire was reissued on CD by Sugar Hill in 1995.

Track listing
All songs by Jerry Douglas unless otherwise noted.
 "T.O.B." – 3:32
 "Dhaka Rok" – 3:20
 "Time Gone By" (Edgar Meyer) – 2:44
 "Monroe's Hornpipe" (Bill Monroe) – 3:23
 "Before the Blues" – 5:31
 "The Trip to Kilkerrin" – 3:23
 "Grant's Corner" – 5:34
 "Redhill" (John Reischman) – 4:58
 "Two Friends" – 2:58
 "A New Day	" – 3:36

Personnel
Jerry Douglas – dobro, lap steel guitar
Sam Bush – mandolin
Béla Fleck – banjo, mandolin
Russ Barenberg – guitar
Edgar Meyer – bass
Connie Heard – violin
Mark O'Connor – violin
Glenn Worf – bass
Neil Worf – drums, percussion

References

1986 albums
Jerry Douglas albums
MCA Records albums